James (Jacobus) J. Dickson (1738–1822) was a Scottish nurseryman, plant collector, botanist and mycologist. Between 1785 and 1801 he published his Fasciculus plantarum cryptogamicarum Britanniae, a four-volume work in which he published over 400 species of algae and fungi that occur in the British Isles He is also the author of Collection of Dried Plants, Named on the Authority of the Linnaean Herbarium and Other Original Collections. The plant genus Dicksonia is named after him.

Life
He was born at Kirke House, Traquair, Peeblesshire, of poor parents, and began life in the gardens of the Earl of Traquair. While still young he went to Jeffery's nursery-garden at Brompton, and in 1772 started in business for himself in Covent Garden.

Dickson made several tours in the Scottish Highlands in search of plants between 1785 and 1791, that of 1789 being in company with Mungo Park, whose sister became his second wife.

Dickson in 1788 became one of the original members of the Linnean Society, and in 1804 was one of the eight original members and a vice-president of the Horticultural Society. He died at Broad Green, Croydon, Surrey, on 14 August 1822, his wife, a son, and two daughters surviving him. His portrait by Henry Perronet Briggs (1820) was lithographed.

Works
Sir Joseph Banks threw open his library to him, and he acquired a wide knowledge of botany, and especially of cryptogamic plants. He published:

 between 1785 and 1801 four Fasciculi Plantarum Cryptogamicarum Britanniæ, containing in all four hundred descriptions; 
 between 1789 and 1799, A Collection of Dried Plants, named on the authority of the Linnæan Herbarium, in seventeen folio fascicles, each containing twenty-five species;
 in 1795, a Catalogus Plantarum Cryptogamicarum Britanniæ;
 and between 1793 and 1802, his Hortus Siccus Britannicus, in nineteen folio fascicles.

He wrote memoirs in the 'Transactions of the Linnean Society. James Edward Smith wrote him an epitaph and Charles Louis L'Héritier de Brutelle dedicated to him the genus Dicksonia, among the tree-ferns.

See also
 :Category:Taxa named by James Dickson (botanist)

References

External links
 http://www.scottish-places.info/people/famousfirst3157.html

Scottish botanists
Scottish botanical writers
Scottish horticulturists
Scottish mycologists
1738 births
1822 deaths
Nurserymen
Plant collectors
Scottish gardeners
Fellows of the Linnean Society of London
People from the Scottish Borders
People from Perth, Scotland
18th-century British botanists
19th-century British botanists
18th-century Scottish businesspeople
19th-century Scottish businesspeople